Viva Kenton! (subtitled Exciting Latin Rhythms with the Kenton Touch) is an album by Stan Kenton, released in 1959 by Capitol Records, and later on Kenton's own Creative World label.

The album features compositions by Gene Roland, and was Kenton's second all-Latin album. It was the follow-up to Kenton's successful Cuban Fire! LP of 1956.

Viva Kenton! features Kenton's 18-piece orchestra, with an additional percussion quartet. Featured soloists are alto saxophonist Charlie Mariano, trombonist Don Sebesky, and trumpeter Rolf Ericson.

In 2005, Blue Note released the album on CD (under the Capitol Jazz imprint) with 6 bonus tracks, all taken from the 1963 album Artistry in Bossa Nova.

Reception

The Allmusic review by Scott Yanow called the album "potentially gimmicky but surprisingly successful".

Track listing
All compositions by Gene Roland except where noted.
"Mexican Jumping Bean" - 4:30
"Siesta" - 3:37
"Cha Cha Sombrero" - 4:48
"Chocolate Caliente" - 3:26
"Aqua Marine" - 2:41
"Opus in Chartreuse Cha-Cha-Cha" - 2:48
"Cha Cha Chee Boom" - 3:50
"Adios" (Enric Madriguera) - 3:09
"Mission Trail" - 3:23
"Artistry in Rhythm" (Stan Kenton) - 3:01
Recorded at the Riverside Plaza Hotel, NYC on September 22, 1959 (track 10) and September 23, 1959 (tracks 1-9)

Personnel
Stan Kenton - piano, conductor
Bud Brisbois, Bill Chase, Rolf Ericson, Roger Middleton, Dalton Smith - trumpet
Kent Larsen, Archie Le Coque, Don Sebesky - trombone 
Jim Amlotte, Bob Knight - bass trombone 
Charlie Mariano - alto saxophone
John Bonnie, Bill Trujillo - tenor saxophone
Marvin Holladay, Jack Nimitz - baritone saxophone
Pete Chivily - bass 
Jimmy Campbell - drums 
Mike Pacheco - bongos, timbales
Willie Rodriguez - congas, bongos
Tommy Lopez - congas (tracks 1-9)

References

Stan Kenton albums
1960 albums
Capitol Records albums
Blue Note Records albums
Albums conducted by Stan Kenton
Albums produced by Lee Gillette